, sometimes credited as Oh! Pro or Oh-Pro, is an anime production studio in Amanuma, Suginami, Tokyo, Japan. It was established in May 1970 by animators Norio Shioyama, Kōichi Murata, Kazuo Komatsubara, and Kōshin Yonekawa.

Former members
Listed alphabetically.
Kazuo Komatsubara (deceased, founding member of Oh! Pro, animation director)
Kitarō Kōsaka
Norio Shioyama (deceased, foundering member of Oh! Pro, animation director)
Kazuhide Tomonaga (left in 1978, currently one of the head animation directors of Telecom Animation Film)

Works

OVAs
Devilman: The Birth (1987)
Devilman: The Demon Bird (1990)

Films
Furiten-kun (1981)
Jarinko Chie (1981) (supporting animation)
Gauche the Cellist (1982)
Fair, then Partly Piggy (1988)
 Umi Da! Funade Da! Nikoniko, Pun (1990)
La Maison en Petits Cubes (2008)

Game animation
Tales of Symphonia (2003)

References

External links
 Official site
 

Mass media companies established in 1970
Japanese animation studios
Animation studios in Tokyo
1970 establishments in Japan
Suginami